Filip Juričić (born April 18, 1981) is a Croatian actor.

Career
He graduated from the Academy of Dramatic Art, University of Zagreb. During his studies, he gave an award-winning performance in the cult classic Exit Play Kako misliš mene nema? with Amar Bukvić. In 2004, he won a Croatian Actor Award for Best Actor Under 28 for his performance in the drama U noći.

In 2002, he starred an adaptation of Don Juan at the Croatian National Theatre in Zagreb. He actively performed in plays produced by the Kufer Theatre, the Agram Theatre, the Žar Ptica Theatre, the Histrion Acting Troupe, the Kerempuh Satirical Theatre, the National Theatre in Rijeka, the Virovitica Theatre, the Knapp Acting House, the Velika Gorica Theatre and Teatar ITD.

Since April 2014, he is a permanent member of the Komedija Theatre in Zagreb. He appeared in over twenty productions, starring in the theatre include Revizor, The Legend of Saint Muhle and Dangerous Relations. In a coproduction between Komedija and the Croatian National Theatre in Varaždin, he gave a critically acclaimed performance as William Shakespeare in the rendition of Shakespeare in Love. For his portrayal of Petruchio in the Komedija Theatre's adaptation of Taming of the Shrew, Juričić won the 2014 Fabijan Šovagović Award for Best Actor in a Play.

On screen, he is known for his lauded television career and his starring roles in In Silence (2006) and The Show Must Go On (2010). For his role in the latter, he was nominated for a Golden Arena for Best Supporting Actor. His other film roles include appearances in Here (2003) and Sex, Drink and Bloodshed (2004). On television, he was prominently featured in numerous ensemble casts as Marko Marušić in Ljubav u zaleđu (2005-2006), Domagoj Rebac in Zakon Ljubavi (2008), Dinko Bilić Larin izbor (2011-2013), Nikola Šeper in Tajne (2013-2014), which embarked commercial acclaim, making Filip Juričić a household name. He is currently starring in the televised comedies Na granici (2018–present) as Marko Lasić and Tate (2020–present) as Petar Malbaša. His role in the latter made him a sex symbol in Serbia.

He also made guest and recurring appearances in Naša mala klinika, Zakon!, Kad zvoni?, Zauvijek susjedi and Čista ljubav. For his guest role in Zauvijek susjedi, he was nominated for a Poseidon Award at the Dalmatia Culture Festival for Outstanding Performance in a Television Comedy. He won the award in 2012 for his lead role in the television film based on Larin izbor, Larin izbor: Izgubljeni princ, co-starring with Doris Pinčić Rogoznica and Ivan Herceg.

His voice acting credits range from radio dramas to Croatian-language versions of animated feature films and motion pictures. His roles in the latter include Donatello in the Teenage Mutant Ninja Turtles (2007), Mayor Ned McDodd in Horton Hears a Who! (2008), Master Monkey in the Kung Fu Panda film series (2008-2016), Flint Lockwood in Cloudy with a Chance of Meatballs (2009) and Cloudy with a Chance of Meatballs 2 (2013), Pedro in Rio (2011) and Rio 2 (2014), Turley in Rango (2011) and the title character in Paddington Bear (2014) and Paddington 2 (2017). Among his hundred characters, he cites his role as Bugsy from the 2005 feature Valiant (originally voiced by Ricky Gervais) as his favourite voice role.

Filmography

Television roles

Movie roles

Croatian voice over dubs

References

External links

1981 births
Croatian Theatre Award winners
Living people
21st-century Croatian male actors
Croatian male stage actors
Croatian male film actors
Croatian male voice actors
Croatian male television actors
Male actors from Zagreb